Kandava Municipality is a former municipality in Courland, Latvia. The municipality was formed in 1999 by merging Cēre Parish and Kandava town with its countryside territory. Later it absorbed Matkule Parish, Vāne Parish, Zante Parish and Zemīte Parish the administrative centre being Kandava.

On 1 July 2021, Kandava Municipality ceased to exist and its territory was merged into Tukums Municipality.

Twin towns – sister cities

Kandava was a member of the Charter of European Rural Communities, a town twinning association across the European Union.

Charter of European Rural Communities
 Bienvenida, Spain
 Bièvre, Belgium
 Bucine, Italy
 Cashel, Ireland
 Cissé, France
 Desborough, England, United Kingdom
 Esch, Netherlands
 Hepstedt, Germany
 Ibănești, Romania
 Kannus, Finland
 Kolindros, Greece
 Lassee, Austria
 Medzev, Slovakia
 Moravče, Slovenia
 Næstved, Denmark
 Nagycenk, Hungary
 Nadur, Malta
 Ockelbo, Sweden
 Pano Lefkara, Cyprus
 Põlva, Estonia
 Samuel, Portugal
 Slivo Pole, Bulgaria
 Starý Poddvorov, Czech Republic
 Strzyżów, Poland
 Tisno, Croatia
 Troisvierges, Luxembourg
 Žagarė, Lithuania

Other twin towns

 Ghelăuza, Moldova
 Lejre, Denmark
 Saku, Estonia
 Šilalė, Lithuania
 Strängnäs, Sweden

See also
 Administrative divisions of Latvia

References

 
Former municipalities of Latvia